*Dyḗus (lit. "daylight-sky-god"), also *Dyḗus ph₂tḗr (lit. "father daylight-sky-god"), is the reconstructed name of the daylight-sky god in Proto-Indo-European mythology. *Dyēus was conceived as a divine personification of the bright sky of the day and the seat of the gods, the *deywṓs. Associated with the vast diurnal sky and with the fertile rains, *Dyēus was often paired with *Dʰéǵʰōm, the Earth Mother, in a relationship of union and contrast.

While its existence is not directly attested by archaeological or written materials, *Dyēus is considered by scholars the most securely reconstructed deity of the Indo-European pantheon, as identical formulas referring to him can be found among the subsequent Indo-European languages and myths of the Vedic Indo-Aryans, Latins, Greeks, Phrygians, Messapians, Thracians, Illyrians, Albanians and Hittites.

Name

Etymology 
The divine name *Dyēus derives from the stem *dyeu-, denoting the "diurnal sky" or the "brightness of the day" (in contrast to the darkness of the night), ultimately from the root *di or dei- ("to shine, be bright"). Cognates in Indo-European languages revolving around the concepts of "day", "sky" and "deity" and sharing the root *dyeu- as an etymon, such as Sanskrit dyumán- 'heavenly, shining, radiant', suggest that Dyēus referred to the vast and bright sky of the day conceived as a divine entity among Proto-Indo-European speakers.

A vṛddhi-derivative appears in *deywós ("celestial"), the common word for "god" in Proto-Indo-European. In classic Indo-European, associated with the late Khvalynsk culture (3900–3500), *Dyēus also had the meaning of "Heaven", whereas it denoted "god" in general (or the Sun-god in particular) in the Anatolian tradition. The suffix-derivative *diwyós ("divine") is also attested in Latin, Greek and Sanskrit. The noun  ("day"), interpreted as a back-formation of *deywós, has descendant cognates in Vedic Sanskrit divé-dive ("day by day"), Latin Dies, goddess of the day and counterpart to Greek Hemera, Hittite siwat ("day"), Palaic Tīyat- ("Sun, day"), Ancient Greek endios ("midday"), Old Armenian tiw (տիւ, "bright day"), Old Irish  ("nine-day period"), Welsh  ("today"), or Slavic Poludnitsa ("Lady Midday").

While the Greek goddess Pandeia or Pandia ("all brightness") may have been another name for the Moon Goddess Selene, her name still preserves the root *di-/*dei-, meaning "to shine, be bright".

Epithets 
The most constant epithet associated with *Dyēus is "father" (*ph2tḗr). The term "Father Dyēus" was inherited in the Vedic Dyáuṣ Pitṛ́, Greek Zeus Patēr, Illyrian Dei-pátrous, Roman Jupiter (*), even in the form of "dad" or "papa" in the Scythian Papaios for Zeus, or the Palaic expression Tiyaz papaz. The epithet *Ph2tḗr Ǵenh1-tōr ("Father Procreator") is also attested in the Vedic, Iranian, Greek, and perhaps the Roman ritual traditions.

Role 
*Dyēus was the Sky or Day conceived as a divine entity, and thus the dwelling of the gods, the Heaven. As the gateway to the deities and the father of both the Divine Twins and the goddess of the Dawn (*H2éwsōs), *Dyēus was a prominent deity in the Proto-Indo-European pantheon. He was however likely not their ruler or the holder of the supreme power like Zeus and Jupiter.

*Dyēus was associated with the bright and vast sky, but also to the cloudy weather in the Vedic and Greek formulas *Dyēus' rain. Although several reflexes of Dyēus are storm deities, such as Zeus and Jupiter, this is thought to be a late development exclusive to Mediterranean traditions, probably derived from syncretism with Canaanite deities and the Proto-Indo-European god *Perkwunos.

Due to his celestial nature, *Dyēus is often described as "all-seeing" or "with wide vision" in Indo-European myths. It is unlikely however that he was in charge of the supervision of justice and righteousness, as it was the case for Zeus or the Indo-Iranian Mithra–Varuna duo, but he was suited to serve at least as a witness to oaths and treaties. Proto-Indo-Europeans also visualized the sun as the "lamp of Dyēus" or the "eye of Dyēus", as seen in various reflexes: "the god's lamp" in Euripides' Medes, "heaven's candle" in Beowulf, "the land of Hatti's torch" (the Sun-goddess of Arinna) in a Hittite prayer, Helios as the eye of Zeus, Hvare-khshaeta as the eye of Ahura Mazda, and the sun as "God's eye" in Romanian folklore.

Consort
*Dyēus is often paired with *Dhéǵhōm, the Earth goddess, and described as uniting with her to ensure the growth and sustenance of terrestrial life; the earth becomes pregnant as the rain falls from the sky. The relationship between Father Sky (*Dyēus Ph2tḗr) and Mother Earth (*Dhéǵhōm Méhatēr) is also of contrast: the latter is portrayed as the vast and dark dwelling of mortals, located below the bright seat of the gods. According to Jackson however, as the thunder-god is frequently associated with the fructifying rains, she may be a more fitting partner of *Perkwunos than of *Dyēus.

While Hausos and the Divine Twins are generally considered the offsprings of *Dyēus alone, some scholars have proposed a spouse-goddess reconstructed as *Diwōnā or *Diuōneh2, with a possible descendant in Zeus's consort Dione. A thematic echo occurs in the Vedic tradition as Indra's wife Indrānī displays a similar jealous and quarrelsome disposition under provocation. A second descendant may be found in Dia, a mortal said to unite with Zeus in a Greek myth. After the mating of Dia's husband Ixion with the phantom of Hera, the spouse of Zeus, the story leads ultimately to the birth of the Centaurs (who may be seen as reminiscent of the Divine Twins, sons of *Dyēus). Another reflex may be found in the Mycenaean Greek Diwia, possibly a feminine counterpart of Zeus attested in the second part of the 2nd millennium BC and which may have survived in the Pamphylian dialect of Asia Minor. The reconstruction is however only based upon the Greek—and to a lesser extent the Vedic—tradition, and it remains therefore not secured.

If the female goddesses Hera, Juno, Frigg and Shakti share a common association with marriage and fertility, Mallory and Adams note however that "these functions are much too generic to support the supposition of a distinct PIE 'consort goddess' and many of the 'consorts' probably represent assimilations of earlier goddesses who may have had nothing to do with marriage."

Evidence

Cognates deriving either from the stem *dyeu- ("daylight, bright sky"), the epithet *Dyēus Ph2ter ("Father Sky"), the vṛddhi-derivative *deiwós ("celestial", a "god"), the derivative *diwyós ("divine"), or the back-formation  (a "day") are among the most widely attested in Indo-European languages.

Descendants 
PIE: *d(e)i-, 'to shine, be bright',
PIE: *dyēus, the daylight-sky god,
Indo-Iranian: *dyauš,
Sanskrit: Dyáuṣ (द्यौष्), the god of Heaven, and dyú (द्यु), the common word for "heaven",
Old Avestan: dyaoš (𐬛𐬫𐬀𐬊𐬱), "heaven", mentioned in a single verse of the Avesta; Young Avestan: diiaoš, "hell", as a result of the Zoroastrian religious reformation,
Mycenaean Greek: di-we (𐀇𐀸 /diwei/), dative case of an otherwise scarcely attested name,
Cypriot Syllabary: ti-wo, interpreted as pertaining to Zeus, and the possible genitive Diwoi,
Greek: Zeus (Ζεύς; gen. Diós), the god of the Sky; also Boeotian Lac., Corinth., Rhod. dialects: Deús (Δεύς),
Italic: ,
Old Latin: Dioue (or loue), Dijovis (diovis),
Latin: Jove (Iove; gen. Iovis), the god of the Sky;
Latin: Diūs, the god of oaths (from  < *diyēus),
Oscan: Diúvei (Διουϝει), genitive singular,
Umbrian: Di or Dei (Grabouie/Graboue), attested in the Iguvine Tablets,
Paelignian: Ioviois (Pvclois) and Ioveis (Pvcles), interpreted as a calque of the Greek theonym Diós-kouroi,
Anatolian: *diéu-, *diu-, a "god",
Hittite: šīuš (𒅆𒍑), a "god" or the Sun-God; a deity named Šiušummiš is mentioned in the Anitta text.
Palaic: tiuna, "divine, a god",
Lydian: ciw-, a "god"; Lefs or Lévs, the Lydian Zeus.
Proto-Armenian: *Tiw, the Sky- or Thunder-god,
Armenian: tiw (Տիւ), "day, daytime, morning" and ti, "day" (only in erk-ti "two days"); and possibly also ciacan "rainbow" (according to Martirosyan, from *Ti(w)-a- attached to *can- "sign, omen", thus "the sign of the Sky/Thunder-god"),
Illyrian: dei-, meaning "heaven" or "God", as in Dei-pátrous, the "sky-father",
Proto-Messapic: *dyēs,
Messapic: Zis or Dis, the sky-god,
Albanian: Zojz, a sky and lightning god; the root *d(e)i- may also be found in Perën-di, a sky and thunder god (with a suffix -di attached to per-en-, an extension of PIE *per- "to strike"),
Thracian: Zi-, Diu-, and Dias- (in personal names),
Phrygian: Tiy-,
Bithynia: Tiyes and the place name Tium (Τιεῖον).

"Sky-Father" epithet

Ritual and formulaic expressions stemming from the form *Dyēus Ph2ter ("Father Dyēus") were inherited in the following liturgic and poetic traditions:

PIE: *dyēus ph2tḗr, 'Father Sky' (voc. *dyeu ph2ter, "O Father Sky"),
Greek: Zeus Patēr (Ζεῦς πατήρ; voc. Ζεῦ πάτερ),
Indo-Iranian: *Dyauš-pHtar,
Vedic: Dyáuṣ-pitā́ (voc. Dyáuṣ-pitṛ́, द्यौष्पितृ),
Italic:  >  (voc. ),
Old Latin: Dies Pater,
Latin: Diespiter (from ); Iūpiter (from ), archaic Iovispater, later Iuppiter,
Oscan: Dípatír, Umbrian: Iupater (dat. Iuve patre), South Picene: dipater (gen. dipoteres),
Illyrian: Deipaturos, recorded by Hesychius as Δειπάτυροϛ (Deipáturos), a god worshiped in Tymphaea.

Other reflexes are variants that have retained both linguistic descendants of the stem *dyeu- ("sky") alongside the original structure "Father God". Some traditions have replaced the epithet *ph2ter with the nursery word papa ("dad, daddy"):

Luwian: Tātis tiwaz, "Daddy Tiwaz", the Sun-god,
Palaic: Tiyaz papaz, "Papa Tiyaz", the Sun-god,
Scythian: Papaios (Papa Zios), "father Zeus", the god of the Sky,
Old Irish: in Dagdae Oll-athair, "Great Father the Dagda" (from the Proto-Celtic formula *sindos dago-dēwos ollo fātir, "Great Father the Good God").

Other variants are less secured:
Hittite: attas Isanus, "Father Sun-god"; the name of the sky-god was replaced with a Hattic sun-god loan, but the original structure of the formula left intact,
Latvian: Debess tēvs, "Father of Heaven",
Old Norse: Óðinn Alföðr, "Odin, All-Father" or "Odin Father of All",
Russian: Stribogŭ, "Father God",
Albanian: Zot, "lord" or "God", epithet of Zojz, the sky-father (generally thought to be derived from Proto-Albanian , "heavenly father"; although the etymology , "lord of the house", has also been proposed),
Tokharian B: kauṃ-ñäkte, 'sun, sun-god'.

"Celestial" derivations 

Cognates stemming from *deywós, a vṛddhi-derivation of *dyēus (the sky-god), are attested in the following traditions:

PIE: *deywós (lit. skyling, pl. *deywṓs), meaning "celestial, heavenly one", hence a "god",
Indo-Iranian: *daivá (daiua), a "god",
Sanskrit: devá (देव), meaning "heavenly, divine, anything of excellence", and devi, female title meaning "goddess";
Avestan: daēva (𐬛𐬀𐬉𐬎𐬎𐬀, daēuua), a term for "demons" in Zoroastrianism, as a result of a religious reformation that degraded the status of prior deities,
Old Persian: daiva meaning "false deities, demons",
Balto-Slavic: *deiwas,
Baltic: *deivas,
Old Lithuanian: Deivas,
Lithuanian: Diēvas, supreme god of the sky,
Old Prussian: Dìews (or Deywis), Latvian: Dievs, and the Baltic Dievaitis ("Little God" or "Prince"), a name used to refer to the Thunder God Perkūnas, or to the Moon God Mėnuo.
Germanic: *tīwaz (pl. *tīwōz), a word for "god" that probably also served as a title (*Tīwaz, "God") that came to be associated with a specific deity whose original name is now lost,
Late Proto-Germanic *Tiwasdag, a calque of Latin dies Martis which gave the word for 'Tuesday' in Old Norse Týs-dagr, Old English Tīwes-dæg, Old Frisian Tīesdi, and Old High German Zies-tag; interpreted as a remnant of the sky and war functions of *Tīwaz by G. Kroonen, although M. L. West views it as unlikely,
Old Norse: Týr, associated with justice; the plural tívar survived as a poetic word for 'the gods', and týr appears in kennings for Odin and Thor, such as in the Odin's names Sigtýr ("victory-god"), Gautatýr ("god of the Geats"), Fimbultýr ("powerful god"), or Hertýr ("army-god"),
Old English: Tīw (or Tīg), Old High German: Zio (or *Ziu), a god,
Gothic: *Teiws, a deity reconstructed from the associated rune ᛏ (Tyz),
Italic: *deiwos, a "god, a deity",
Old Latin: , the "gods",
Latin: , common name for a "god, a deity"; and Dea ("goddess"), a title assigned to various Roman goddesses like Dea Tacita, Bona Dea or Dea Dia ("Goddess of the Daylight" or "Bright Goddess").
Vulgar Latin: Deus, the god of Christianity in the Vetus Latina and the Vulgate,
Oscan: deivas, Venetic: deivos, "gods",
Volscian: deue Decluna, attested in an inscription from Velitrae, possibly from the 3rd century BC.
Celtic: *dēwos, a "god, a deity", and *dago-dēwos, the "good god", old name of the Dagda,
Celtiberian: , a "god",
Gaulish: , a "god",
Gaulish: Devona (/deuona/) or Divona (//), a deity of sacred waters, springs, and rivers whose name means "Divine",
Old Welsh: Dubr Duiu ("Water of the Divinity"), evolving into Mod. Welsh Dyfrdwy (River Dee, Wales). The form deva, diva ("goddess") likewise appears in Celtic river names throughout Western Europe, such as in the Scottish rivers Dēoúa (modern-day Dee, Galloway), and Dēouana (Δηουανα; modern-day Don, Aberdeenshire),
Old Irish: día, a "god", and An Dag-da, the druid-god of wisdom,
Irish: Dhe ("god"), attested in the modern Sùil Dhé mhóir prayer ("The eye of the great God", in reference to the Sun), featured in Carmina Gadelica.
Messapic: deiva, dīva, "goddess",
Phrygian: devos.

Other cognates are less secured:

Slavic: *diva (> *dîvo), perhaps a word for a "good deity" which progressively took the meaning of "miracle", hence "evil being",
Old Church Slavonic: divo, Old Polish: dziwo, Russian: dívo, Serbo-Croatian: dîvo, "miracle(s)",
OCS: divŭ, "demon", South Slavic: div, "giant, demonic being", Czech: divo-žena, "sorceress, witch", Slovak: divo, "monster", although the Proto-Slavic root *divŭ(jĭ) ("wild") has also been proposed,
Polish: Dziewanna, Sorbian: Dživica, Slavic equivalent of Diana, however, other etymologies have been proposed.
Lusitanian: Reo, an unknown deity.
Lusitanian: Deiba and Deibo, attested in votive inscriptions of altars; taken to mean the "local" or "indigenous" pronunciations of Deae and Deo.

"Divine" derivations 
Other cognates deriving from the adjective *diwyós (*dyeu "sky" + yós, a thematic suffix) are attested in the following traditions:

 PIE: *diwyós, meaning "divine, heavenly, godlike",
Mycenaean Greek: di-wi-jo, di-wi-ja,
Greek: dîos (δῖος), "belonging to heaven, godlike", also "belonging to Zeus" in tragedies; feminine Día (Δῖα < *Díw-ya), a goddess venerated in classical times at Phlius and Sicyon, and possibly identified with Hebe, the cup-bearer of the gods,
 Indo-Iranian: *diuiHa- / diuiia-,
 Sanskrit: divyá, "heavenly",
Avestan: daeuuiia, "devilish, diabolic",
Proto-Italic: *dīwī (dat.abl.pl. dīwīs),
Latin: dīvus, dīvī, "divine, heavenly, godlike",
According to de Vaan, "the occurrence of the deity Dīs together with pater may be due to association with Di(e)spiter."
Latin: dīus, dīā, another adjective with the same meaning, probably based on *dīwī > diī (dat.abl.pl. dīs),
Latin: Diāna (from an older Dīāna), goddess of the moon and the countryside.

Legacy 
As the pantheons of the individual mythologies related to Proto-Indo-European religion evolved, attributes of *Dyēus seem to have been redistributed to other deities. In Greek and Roman mythology, *Dyēus was the chief god, while the etymological continuant of Dyēus became a very abstract god in Vedic mythology, and his original prominence over other gods largely diluted.

In Albanian tradition 

After the first access of the ancestors of the Albanians to the Christian religion in antiquity the term Zot has been used for God, the Father and the Son (Christ). In Albanian folk beliefs the peak of mountains like Tomorr in central Albania has been associated with Zojz. The enduring sanctity of the mountain, the annual pilgrimage to its summit, and the solemn sacrifice of a white bull by the local people provide abundant evidence that the ancient cult of the Sky-God on Mount Tomorr continues through the generations almost untouched by the course of political events and religious changes.

In Slavic tradition 
At one point, early Slavs, like some Iranian peoples after the Zoroastrian religious reformation, demonized the Slavic successor of *Dyēus (abandoning this word in the sense of "heaven" at the same time, keeping the word for day, however, and abandoning many of the names of the other Proto-Indo-European gods, replacing them with new Slavic or Iranian names), while not replacing it with any other specific god, as a result of cultural contacts with Iranian peoples in the first millennium BC. Hence, after the process of demonization by the Slavs, *Dyēus is considered to have originated two continuations: *divo ("strange, odd thing") and *divъ ("demon"). The result of this demonization may be Pan-Slavic demons, e.g. Polish and Czech dziwożona, or Div occurring in The Tale of Igor's Campaign.

According to some researchers, at least some of *Dyēus'''s traits could have been taken over by Svarog (Urbańczyk: Sun-Dažbóg – heavenly fire, Svarožič – earthly fire, Svarog – heaven, lightning). Helmold recalls that the Slavs were also supposed to believe in a god in heaven, who only deals with heavenly matters and commands other gods.

 In non-Indo-European traditions 
Various loanwords of *deiwós were introduced in non-Indo-European languages, such as Estonian taevas or Finnish taivas'' ("sky"), borrowed from Proto-Indo-Iranian.

References

Bibliography

Further reading

 
 
 
 
 
 
 
 
 

Proto-Indo-European deities
Sky and weather gods
Etymologies
Reconstructed words
Proto-Indo-European mythology

ja:デウス